Cultúrlann McAdam Ó Fiaich (An Chultúrlann) is an Irish language cultural centre in The Gaeltacht Quarter and is located on the Falls Road, Belfast. Opened in 1991, the centre underwent renovation in 2010 and was opened the following year by then Irish President Mary McAleese.

The centre is home to an art gallery named after local artist Gerard Dillon, a theatre, restaurant, book shop, offices and conference rooms. In 2011, the centre was estimated to receive over 80,000 visitors per year.

History

1991–2010 

Cultúrlann McAdam Ó Fiaich was founded in 1991 after the purchase of Broadway Presbyterian Church on Falls Road, Belfast. It is named after 19th century Presbyterian businessman and Gaelic revivalist Robert Shipboy MacAdam and 20th century Gaelic scholar Cardinal Tomás Ó Fiaich.

Co-founder Gearóid Ó Cairealláin also founded Raidió Fáilte which aired from the building and Aisling Ghéar, the resident theatre production group. An Chultúrlann was also home to Coláiste Feirste, Northern Ireland's first Irish-medium secondary school with activist Fergus O'Hare serving as principal. The school began with nine pupils., before the school moved to the nearby Beech Hill House, previously owned by the Riddel family.

In 2010, An Chultúrlann announced a major renovation programme funded by the Department of Culture, Arts and Leisure, Arts Council of Northern Ireland, International Fund for Ireland, Northern Ireland Tourist Board and the Department for Social Development.

2011 – present 

The renovated Cultúrlann McAdam Ó Fiaich was re-opened by Irish president Mary McAleese on 19 September 2011, to celebrate 20 years since the centre's opening. The extension and renovation cost £1.9million and included the building of an interactive exhibition space and art gallery, named after local artist Gerard Dillon. Also refurbished was An Ceathrú Póilí, an Irish language bookshop within the centre and Bia, the restaurant.

BBC Two Northern Ireland aired a documentary on 12 December 2011 to celebrate the reopening.

Spaces and resident organisations 
 Gerard Dillon Gallery – art gallery
 Siobhán McKenna Theatre – theatre and concert hall
 An Ceathrú Póilí – Irish language bookshop
 Na Ballaí Bána – gallery
 An Taiscumar – interactive exhibition
 Bia – restaurant
 Aisling Ghéar – theatre company
 Nós – Irish language magazine
 Tobar Productions – TV production company

Former resident organisations 
 Raidió Fáilte – Radio station founded in An Chultúrlann
 Coláiste Feirste – Irish language secondary school founded in An Chultúrlann in 1991
 Lá / Lá Nua – former Irish language daily newspaper
 Dúch Dúchais – design company

References

External links 

 An Chultúrlann – official website
 An Chultúrlann – Facebook page
 Bia – restaurant
 An Ceathrú Póilí – book shop

Music venues in Belfast
Music in Belfast
Theatres in Belfast
Buildings and structures in Belfast
Art museums and galleries in Northern Ireland
Photography museums and galleries in Northern Ireland
Tourist attractions in Belfast
Art galleries established in 1991
1991 establishments in Northern Ireland
Former churches in Northern Ireland
Former Presbyterian churches
Churches in Belfast
20th-century architecture in Northern Ireland